Guerrilla publishing is a catchall term that encompasses many different low budget efforts at self-publishing and micro publishing. Some restrict the use of the term to mean only the publishing of books and pamphlets by employees who use their employers' office supplies to produce their books, but current usage of the term also includes what in the past would have been called small press publishers.

The term "guerrilla publishing" was first used in 1988 at the Catholic University of Louvain, Belgium by student leader Gert Van Mol. It described the processes underground student- and sport club magazines could follow to try to surface into mainstream publishing environment. Main steps included:
 defining a specific set of sub cultural characteristics of the student- or sports community (the readership of the magazine), 
 re-sell some of the most authentic characteristics to mainstream media, media centrals and advertisers via a creative marketing campaign in order to establish brand awareness and a more than average cost per contact.
 keep the attention span from the mainstream media and advertisers alive by proliferation of new magazine titles,
 continuous investment of student resources in new experimental technologies to reach readers and advertisers such as internet and websites,
 the use of 'guerrilla'- like tactics in alternating between zero cost technologies and marketing initiatives.

Gert Van Mol continued to establish his proper Publishing Company after mastering at the university. Typically to illustrate 'Publishing is Guerrilla', the entrance of the company was staged as a war zone.

Publishing